Aglaia leptantha is a species of tree in the family Meliaceae. It is found in Mainland and Island Southeast Asia. People use the plant for food, incense, and for human and bovine medicine. Gibbons also eat parts of the tree.

Description
A tree growing some 20-35m tall. The wood is red. Distinguishing traits include that the secondary veins on the leaves are usually less than ten, though rarely more, and that the leaflets dry to a blackish to blackish-green colour.  
In Thailand the tree flowers from August to October, with fruiting occurring from October to April.

Distribution
The species is found in Mainland and Island Southeast Asia. Countries and regions that it is native to are: Indonesia (Nusa Tenggara, Kalimantan, Sumatera); Philippines; Malaysia (Sabah, Sarawak, Peninsular Malaysia); Thailand; Cambodia; Vietnam; and Laos.

Habitat & ecology
Occurs in many forest habitats and in seasonal swamps.

In upland Cavite (Luzon, Philippines) the natural forest, a lowland evergreen dipterocarp rainforest, is under threat from deforestation, mining and pollution.  
The dominant trees are Shorea guiso, Ficus chrysolepis, Diospyros pyrrhocarpa, Buchanania arborescens and Strombosia philippinensis. A. leptantha is a minor taxa (less than 1% importance value) in this forest.

In Thailand it is recorded in evergreen forests, growing in sediments derived from sandstone, limestone or granite bedrock, at 500–1,100m altitude.

In Cambodia and Vietnam it is restricted to montane forests.

Local people in the Veun Sai-Siem Pang Conservation Area, northeastern Cambodia, have observed Northern yellow-cheeked crested gibbons (Nomascus annamensis) eating parts of A. leptantha.

Conservation
The species is considered Lower Risk/Near Threatened by the IUCN Red List mainly because of the threat of habitat loss.

Vernacular names
sang khriat lueat (สังเครียดเลือด) (Thailand)
sang ka tong (สังกะโต้ง) (Peninsular Thailand)
sdau phnôm (sdau="Azadirachta indica", phnôm="mountain", Khmer language)  
sdau ânluëk (ânluëk="vegetables", Khmer)
santal rouge de Cochinchinense (="red sandalwood of Cochinchina", French)

Uses
In Thailand the aril is eaten.
In Cambodia the young leaves are eaten in salads, like those of the genuine sdau (Azadirachta indica). The red wood is fragrant and used as incense, like sandalwood (Santalum spp.) A decoction of the bark is used in local medicine to treat fever in people and to increase the appetite of oxen and buffalo.

History
The species was first described in 1868 by the Nederlander botanist Friedrich Anton Wilhelm Miquel (1811–71).  
After an early career as a medical doctor and academic, he became a leading expert on the botany of the then Nederlands West Indies, now Indonesia. He published his description in Annales Musei Botanici Lugduno-Batavi (Amsterdam).

Further reading
Dy Phon, Pauline, 2000, Dictionnaire des plantes utilisées au Cambodge, chez l'auteur, Phnom Penh, Cambodia    *Govaerts, 1995, World Checklist of Seed Plants 1(1, 2)
Lê, T.C. (2003). Danh lục các loài thục vật Việt Nam [Checklist of Plant Species of Vietnam] 3: 1–1248. Hà Noi : Nhà xu?t b?n Nông nghi?p
Newman et al., 2007, A checklist of the vascular plants of Lao PDR
Turner, 1995, 'A catalogue of the Vascular Plants of Malaya', Gardens' Bulletin Singapore 47(1):1-346
Wongprasert et al., 2011, 'A synoptic account of the Meliaceae of Thailand', Thai Forest Bulletin (Botany) 39:210-266

References

leptantha
Flora of Cambodia
Flora of Indo-China
Flora of Malesia
Near threatened plants
Plants described in 1868
Taxa named by Friedrich Anton Wilhelm Miquel
Taxonomy articles created by Polbot